Sameh is an Arabic surname and male given name. Notable people with this name include:

Surname
 Abdelrahman Sameh (born 2000), Egyptian swimmer
 Ahmed Sameh, Egyptian computer scientists

Given name
 Sameh Abdel Rahman (born 1943), Egyptian fencer
 Sameh Akram Habeeb, British-Palestinian journalist
 Sameh Ashour, Egyptian lawyer
 Sameh Derbali (born 1986), Tunisian football player
 Sameh Fahmi (born 1949), Egyptian politician
 Sameh Maraaba (born 1992), Palestinian football player
 Sameh Mohamed (born 1980), Egyptian field hockey player
 Sameh Naguib, Egyptian sociologist
 Sameh El-Saharty, Egyptian doctor
 Sameh Saeed (born 1992), Iraqi football player
 Sameh Shoukry (born 1952), Egyptian diplomat
 Sameh Soliman (born 1941), Egyptian water polo player
 Sameh El Torgoman, Egyptian businessman
 Sameh Abdel Waress (born 1971), Egyptian handball player
 Sameh Youssef (born 1978), Egyptian football player
 Sameh Zakout, Palestinian rapper
 Sameh Zoabi, Palestinian director

Arabic masculine given names